Österlen is a region in the southeast of the Swedish province of Scania (Skåne). Historically, the region was shared between the counties of Kristianstad and Malmöhus for a small part in the southwest, until Skåne County was created in 1997. Österlen includes the municipalities of Simrishamn and Tomelilla and a rural part of Ystad.

The towns of Simrishamn and Tomelilla are of very similar sizes, but the Simrishamn municipal population is somewhat larger. Österlen has approximately in between 35 000 to 40 000 permanent inhabitants but plenty of seasonal vacation homes means that the population soars during summer months.

The area is a tourist destination known for its natural environment, historic buildings, fishing hamlets, small towns and farmland.

Geography

Municipalities
 Simrishamn
 Tomelilla
 Ystad (part)

Coastal settlements
 Baskemölla
 Brantevik
 Simrishamn (municipal seat)
 Skillinge
 Kivik

Inland settlements
 Borrby
 Brösarp
 Glemmingebro
 Gärsnäs
 Hammenhög
 Löderup
 Onslunda
 Sankt Olof
 Tomelilla (municipal seat)

History
The name derives from its location 'the way eastwards' (ancient route from Ystad, heading north-east); (len is short for leden, i.e. route).In the past, the area west of Ystad was called "Västerlen" (the way westwards) but that term is no longer in use. In the 17th century, when Österlen and the whole of Scania (Skåne) were Danish, the Österlen area was called 'Östreslätt', which means 'the eastern plains' and comprised the area from Ystad to Simrishamn and probably the lands northwards until the woodland belt began. We have no 17th-century evidence of the usage of the word 'Österlen' as of today.   
The descriptive term Österlen is associated with the writings of Nils Lovén (1796–1858) who was a clergyman and university professor as well as an author and the ethnologist Nils Gustaf Bruzelius who claimed that it was a well-known fact that people from Österlen and people from Västerlen were always at loggerheads and were of very different natures. Bruzelius also considered the usage of the term "Österlen" as "ancient.".

Use of the term Österlen was popularized during the 1920s by author Fritiof Nilsson Piraten (1895–1972), poet Pehr Theodor Tufvesson (1884–1947) and newspaper journalist John Oskar Osterman (1871–1942). Many songs and poems have been written about Österlen. One of the most popular songs is Om himlen och Österlen, composed by Scanian singer-songwriter Michael Saxell.

Österlen was defined in 1929 as including Albo härad, Ingelstad härad and Järrestad härad in the southeastern part of the Scania. Today the term is associated with Tomelilla Municipality, Ystad Municipality and Simrishamn Municipality. Österlen encompasses the cities of Simrishamn and Tomelilla as well as including Stenshuvud National Park.
The map that is published here is not historically correct in that Ingelstad härad/hundred included all the territory to the city of Ystad itself. There were temporary redrawings of this and other borders but from the beginning of the hundred system, Ingelstad went to the city of Ystad, and locations like Nybro and Köpinge are included in our first descriptions of Österlen.

Climate
Österlen has a maritime climate with a moderated coastline and a slightly warmer interior during summers. Even so, the cool temperatures of the Baltic Sea keeps the immediate coastline on average a couple of degrees cooler during July days than in places further north in the country. This is due to the dominance of water in the surroundings, whereas the Mälar valley around Stockholm is surrounded by more land.

Especially during summer, seasonal lag is strong on the local coastline. This means that August averages the warmest summer nights and that September is a lot warmer than May as the sea water gradually warms. During winter, this maritime proximity of Österlen reverses the climate patterns and leads to average highs above  on the coastline and frosts usually being weak even while frequent. Records for Skillinge began in 1995 and as such do not contain likely historical extremes, whereas Bollerup had the station open from 1945 to 2021.

Historical buildings and places
Historical buildings in Österlen include the medieval castle Glimmingehus, St. Nicholas Church in Simrishamn, known since the 12th century, and the medieval St. Olof Church. Ale's Stones near Kåseberga on the south coast and The King's Grave in Kivik are ancient historical monuments.

Cultural events and festivals
Cultural events and festivals such as the arts exhibition Konstrundan and the apple market in Kivik are arranged every year.

Gallery

References

External links
Österlen website
Österlen & Ystad website

Geography of Skåne County